FSIF may stand for:

 Football Stadia Improvement Fund, organisation providing funding to lower-level football clubs in England
 Friendly Society of Iron Founders, former British trade union